Aurélien Djani Tchouaméni (born 27 January 2000) is a French professional footballer who plays as a defensive midfielder for La Liga club Real Madrid and the France national team.

Early life
Tchouaméni was born in Rouen, Seine-Maritime, but grew up in Bordeaux, Gironde. He is of Cameroonian descent.

Club career

Bordeaux
Tchouaméni made his first team debut for Bordeaux in a 1–0 UEFA Europa League away win to Latvian side Ventspils in the second qualifying round on 26 July 2018, starting the match and playing 89 minutes. He scored his first goal of his senior club career on 9 August, netting the final goal in Bordeaux's 3–1 Europa League away victory over Mariupol.

Monaco
On 29 January 2020, Tchouaméni signed a four-and-a-half-year deal with Ligue 1 side Monaco. After about a year playing for the club, he registered his first league goal, netting the second goal in a 3–1 win against Marseille on 23 January 2021. On 14 May 2022, he delivered an assist for his captain Wissam Ben Yedder and, thus, participated in the ninth win in a row for his side.

Real Madrid
On 11 June 2022, it was announced that Tchouaméni would be transferred to La Liga side Real Madrid on 1 July 2022, signing a six-year contract with the club. The transfer fee was reported to be €80 million, which could rise to €100 million due to additional fees.

International career
On 26 August 2021, Tchouaméni received his first call up to the France senior squad. On 1 September, he made his international debut in a 2022 FIFA World Cup qualifying game against Bosnia and Herzegovina replacing Thomas Lemar in the 46th minute. On 25 March 2022, Tchouaméni scored his first goal for the national team in a friendly against Ivory Coast. In November 2022, he was named in the final squad for the 2022 FIFA World Cup. On 10 December, he scored his first World Cup goal in a 2–1 win over England in the quarter-finals.

Career statistics

Club

International

France score listed first, score column indicates score after each Tchouaméni goal

Honours
Monaco
Coupe de France runner-up: 2020–21

Real Madrid
UEFA Super Cup: 2022
FIFA Club World Cup: 2022

France
UEFA Nations League: 2020–21
FIFA World Cup runner-up: 2022

Individual
Ligue 1 Young Player of the Year: 2020–21
Ligue 1 UNFP Team of the Year: 2020–21, 2021–22

References

External links

Profile at the Real Madrid CF website

2000 births
Living people
Footballers from Rouen
French footballers
Association football midfielders
FC Girondins de Bordeaux players
AS Monaco FC players
Real Madrid CF players
Championnat National 3 players
Ligue 1 players
La Liga players
France youth international footballers
France under-21 international footballers
France international footballers
2022 FIFA World Cup players
UEFA Nations League-winning players
French expatriate footballers
Expatriate footballers in Spain
French expatriate sportspeople in Spain
French sportspeople of Cameroonian descent